Scott Arnold (born 13 September 1985) is an Australian professional golfer.

Arnold was a top amateur golfer, winning several events in Australia. He was the number one ranked golfer in the World Amateur Golf Ranking for five weeks in early 2009.

Arnold turned professional in 2009. He has played on the European Tour, Challenge Tour, OneAsia Tour and the PGA Tour of Australasia. He won his first professional tournament in January 2012 at the Victorian Open.

Amateur wins
this list may be incomplete
2006 Hong Kong Amateur
2008 Riversdale Cup
2009 Australian Amateur, Lake Macquarie Amateur

Professional wins (2)

PGA Tour of Australasia wins (1)

PGA Tour of Australasia playoff record (0–1)

Challenge Tour wins (1)

Results in major championships

CUT = missed the half-way cut
"T" = tied

Team appearances
Amateur
Sloan Morpeth Trophy (representing Australia): 2008 (winners)
Australian Men's Interstate Teams Matches (representing New South Wales): 2007 (winners), 2008

See also
2012 European Tour Qualifying School graduates

References

External links

Australian male golfers
PGA Tour of Australasia golfers
1985 births
Living people